King of the Jews is the second album by Oxbow, originally released on vinyl only April 1, 1991 through CFY Records.

Track listing

Personnel 
Oxbow
Dan Adams – bass guitar, Kecak hand claps and chanting
Tom Dobrov – drums, percussion
Eugene S. Robinson – vocals
Niko Wenner – guitars, piano, Kecak hand claps and chanting, production (1991/2011)
Additional personnel
Lydia Lunch – vocals (A1, A3, 8, 9)
Greg Davis, Monte Vallier, Gabriel Ferriera – Kecak hand claps and chanting (A1, 8)
Bart Thurber – recording
Susan Charette – conductor, string quartet (A2, 10)
Josepha Fath – violin (A2, 10)
Sarah Bernstein – violin (B2)
Jeff Lucas – 'cello (A2, 10)
Jim Blanchard – artwork, design

2011 Remastered Version
Monte Vallier – Additional production

References

External links
 

1991 albums
Oxbow (band) albums
Cultural depictions of Sammy Davis Jr.